Ernst, Prince of Leiningen (9 November 1830 – 5 April 1904) was a German nobleman who served with distinction in the British Royal Navy.

Biography
He was the elder son of Carl, Prince of Leiningen and Countess Marie von Klebelsberg. His father was the maternal half-brother of Queen Victoria of the United Kingdom.

Ernst Leopold joined the Royal Navy in 1849, seeing action in the Second Burma War and later, the Crimean War, where he participated in the Danube and Baltic campaigns. He served as Lieutenant on board the HMS Duke of Wellington and HMS Cossack in 1855, after which he was promoted to Captain in 1860 and given command of the HMS Magicienne, and then HMY Victoria and Albert. He further served as Commander-in-Chief, The Nore in 1885–87, was promoted to full Admiral in 1887 and retired from the Navy in 1895.

Upon his father's death on 13 November 1856, Ernst Leopold acceded to the title of Prince of Leiningen. He also inherited the memberships of the upper houses of the parliaments of Bavaria, Hesse and by Rhine and Baden, his family having owned estates and lands in those states. In 1863, he was nominated as a candidate for the throne of Greece by the British government under Henry Temple, Viscount Palmerston, but declined it; the throne was eventually accepted by Prince William of Denmark, who reigned as King George I until 1913.

Ernst Leopold died in Amorsbach in 1904, and was succeeded as Prince by his son Emich.

Marriage and issue
On 11 September 1858 in Karlsruhe he married Princess Marie of Baden (1834–1899), second daughter and seventh child of Leopold, Grand Duke of Baden and Sophie of Sweden. They had two children:

Princess Alberta of Leiningen (23 July 1863 – 30 August 1901).
Emich, Prince of Leiningen (18 January 1866 – 18 July 1939) he married Princess Feodore of Hohenlohe-Langenburg on 12 July 1894. They had five children.

Honours and awards

Ancestry

References

|-

1830 births
1904 deaths
Leiningen family
Princes of Leiningen
Members of the First Chamber of the Diet of the Grand Duchy of Baden
Members of the First Chamber of the Estates of the Grand Duchy of Hesse
Members of the Bavarian Reichsrat
Royal Navy personnel of the Crimean War
People from Amorbach
Knights Grand Cross of the Order of the Bath
Grand Crosses of the Order of the Dannebrog
Recipients of the Order of the Medjidie, 1st class